The Texas Pioneer Woman Monument is an outdoor memorial commemorating the pioneer women of Texas, installed on the Texas State Capitol grounds in Austin, Texas, United States. The monument was sculpted by Linda Sioux Henley and erected by the Daughters of the Republic of Texas, District VIII, in 1998. It features a bronze statue of a pioneer mother and her baby on a Texas Sunset Red Granite pedestal.

See also

 1998 in art

References

External links
 

1998 establishments in Texas
1998 sculptures
Bronze sculptures in Texas
Granite sculptures in Texas
Monuments and memorials in Texas
Outdoor sculptures in Austin, Texas
Sculptures of children in the United States
Sculptures of women in Texas
Statues in Texas